Alfons Adrianus (Thierry) Aartsen (born 19 December 1989) is a Dutch politician who has been serving as a Member of the House of Representatives since September 2018. He served as a councillor of Breda municipality between 2010 and 2018. Aartsen is a member of the People's Party for Freedom and Democracy (VVD).

Biography
Aartsen completed the havo at the Newmancollege in Breda. Afterwards, he studied European Studies at The Hague University of Applied Sciences, where he obtained a bachelor's degree.

Aartsen joined the People's Party for Freedom and Democracy (VVD) in 2007. In 2010, Aartsen was elected a member of the Breda municipal council. He was re-elected twice, in 2014 and 2018. He served as the chairman of the VVD in the council from 2015 to 2018. Aartsen also worked as an account manager at FME-CWM from 2013 to 2018.

For the 2017 general election, Aartsen placed 46th on the VVD's list of candidates, which was not high enough for him to be elected. In September 2018, the VVD announced that they had selected Aaartsen to succeed Jeanine Hennis-Plasschaert. On 13 September, he was sworn in as a member of the House of Representatives. When he took office, he received criticism for a number of tweets that he had posted a few years earlier concerning suicides by train causing him delay. He apologised for the tweets.

References

External links
Thierry Aartsen – Tweede Kamer (in Dutch)
Thierry Aartsen – VVD (in Dutch)

1989 births
Living people
21st-century Dutch politicians
Members of the House of Representatives (Netherlands)
Municipal councillors of Breda
People from Breda
People's Party for Freedom and Democracy politicians
The Hague University of Applied Sciences alumni